The Prestige Order of the National Hero is an order of chivalry and a society of honour instituted by Queen Elizabeth II in right of Grenada through the National Honours and Awards Act which having been passed by the House of Representatives of Grenada on 16 November 2007 and passed by the Senate of Grenada on 27 November 2007 received Royal Assent on 31 December 2007. Members are accorded the style "The Right Excellent".

King Charles III is the sovereign of the order in his capacity as King of Grenada. Appointments to the Order are made by Governor-General of Grenada, as Grand Master, who acts on the advise of the Prime Minister of Grenada and the National Awards Advisory Committee.

The Governor General conducts vice-regal investitures at Government House in St George's. Awards are usually announced each year on the occasion of the National Day of Grenada - 7 February.

National Heroes
The Right Excellent Sir Eric Gairy (1922-1997)

References

External links
 Chapter 204A National Honours and Awards Act | Government of Grenada

Grenadian awards
Dynastic orders
Awards established in 2007
2007 establishments in North America